Romina Paz Parraguirre Plaza (born 22 September 1990) is a Chilean footballer who plays as a goalkeeper. She has been a member of the Chile women's national team.

International career
Parraguirre was a non-playing squad member for Chile at the 2008 FIFA U-20 Women's World Cup. She capped at senior level during the 2006 South American Women's Football Championship.

Romi is now playing the amazing Ravens first grade team in Sydney and just won goalie of the year.

Awards
Colo-Colo
Copa Libertadores Femenina runner-up: 2015, 2017

Other media
Parraguirre has participated in Chilean reality television series Pelotón and Calle 7. She was runner-up in the fifth season of the former and has won the sixth and eighth editions of the latter.

References 

1990 births
Living people
Cardinal Silva Henríquez Catholic University alumni
Footballers from Santiago
Chilean women's footballers
Women's association football goalkeepers
Colo-Colo (women) footballers
Chile women's international footballers
Chilean expatriate women's footballers
Chilean expatriate sportspeople in Australia
Expatriate women's soccer players in Australia